Ketill Björnsson, nicknamed Flatnose (Old Norse: Flatnefr), was a Norse King of the Isles of the 9th century.

Primary sources
The story of Ketill and his daughter Auðr (or Aud) was probably first recorded by the Icelander Ari Þorgilsson (1067 – 1148). Ari was born not long after the death of his great-grandmother Guðrún Ósvífrsdóttir – a prominent character in the Laxdæla saga whose husband, Thorkell Eyjolfsson, was descended from Auðr. Ari was thus a direct descendant of Ketill and so, when he wrote his story of Ketill, he was drawing in part on oral traditions amongst his own relatives.

Ketill was also depicted in such works as the Laxdæla saga, Eyrbyggja saga and the Saga of Erik the Red, while his genealogy was described in detail in the Landnámabók.

However, like many other medieval histories, all of these Old Norse works were written long after the events they described. No contemporaneous records of Ketill's life are known to exist, with the arguable exception of a single entry in the Annals of Ulster.

Saga biography
Ketill Björnsson was the son of Björn Grímsson. In the Laxdaela saga he is recorded as being from Romsdal (Raumsdal), a valley  in the county of Møre og Romsdal,  between Nordmøre and Sunnmøre and from Sogn in the Landnámabók.

After  Harald Fairhair had won the decisive Battle of Hafrsfjord in the late 9th century, many fled from Norway. According to the Orkneyinga saga, some of these Vikings began to raid Norway in summer from the Orkney and Shetland islands north of mainland Scotland. For this reason Harald set sail to uproot the attackers.  He defeated them and also took possession of the Hebrides and the Isle of Man. This story is retold in the Eyrbyggja saga, but here it is Ketill rather than Harald who led the expedition, and after the initial victory the former retained the islands as "personal domain" rather than bringing them under Harald's rule. In the Laxdaela saga the same story is told, but here Ketill is one of the Vikings who have fled to the Isles to escape Harald's tyranny. In the Landnámabók the initial conquest is led by Harald, but as soon as he returned to Norway the raiders regrouped. At this point Harald sent Ketill to win the islands back again. Ketill did so but paid no tribute, at which point Harald took possession of what was owed from possessions of Ketill in Norway and sent away Ketill's sons. Some sources refer to Ketill as "King of the Sudreys" although there is little evidence that he himself claimed that title.

According to the Landnámabók, Ketill became ruler of a region already settled by Scandinavians. He left no successors there, and there is little record of Norse activity in the west of Scotland in the first four decades of the 10th century.

Most of Ketill's family eventually emigrated to Iceland.   Ketill's wife was Yngvild Ketilsdóttir, daughter of Ketill Wether, a hersir from Ringerike. They had a number of children, including Bjǫrn Ketilsson, who lived at Bjarnarhofn; Helgi "Bjolan" Ketilsson, who lived at Esjuberg on Kjalarnes;  Thorunn Ketilsdatter, wife of Helgi the Lean, the first settler in Eyjafjordur bay; and Jorunn Ketilsdatter. Ketill's daughter,  Aud the Deep-Minded, married Olaf the White, King of Dublin. Their son, Thorstein the Red, briefly conquered much of northern Scotland during the 870s and 880s before he was killed in battle. Aud and many members of her clan settled in the Laxdael region of Iceland.

Interpretations
Hunter (2000) states that Ketill was "in charge of an extensive island realm and, as a result, sufficiently prestigious to contemplate the making of agreements and alliances with other princelings". However, Woolf (2007) suggests that the story of his failing to pay tax to Harald "looks very much like a story created in later days to legitimise Norwegian claims to sovereignty in the region" and some scholars believe that this entire story of Harald's expedition is apocryphal and based on the later voyages of Magnus Barefoot. Although Norse military activity in Ireland in the 9th century is well documented in Irish sources, they contain no record at all of Harald Fairhair's voyage to the west.

Furthermore, Harald is assumed to have annexed the Northern Isles (comprising Orkney and Shetland) in 875 or later. If Ketill's suzerainty post-dates this time, it is hard to see how Thorstein the Red, an adult grandson of his, could have been active in the 870s and 880s. It is therefore likely that Ketill's floruit in the Hebrides was at a period that pre-dates Harald's victory at Hafrsfjord.

Caittil Find
Ketill Flatnose is also sometimes equated with Caittil Find, a reported leader of the Gallgáedil recorded in the Annals of Ulster as fighting in Ireland in 857. This source states simply that "Ímar and Amlaíb inflicted a rout on Caittil the Fair and his Norse-Irish in the lands of Munster." (Ímar and Amlaíb are well-attested Norse leaders active in Ireland and the Isles in the 9th century.)

The Ketill/Caittil relationship was first proposed by E. W. Robertson in 1862, and then rejected by J. H. Todd in 1867. Robertson's position has since been supported by, among others, W. F. Skene and A. P. Smyth, while others, including A. O. Anderson and Donnchadh Ó Corráin are more skeptical.

In more recent scholarly debate, Claire Downham has endorsed Ó Corráin's view. The connection is described by Woolf (2007) as "extremely tenuous", but Jennings and Kruse (2009) have supported the identification.

Woolf argues that:
 Ketill was a common Norse name during this period, and there is no certainty that "Ketill" and "Caittil" can be equated. 
 Find means "white" rather than "flat-nosed".
 There is nothing in the saga sources to indicate either that Ketill was active in Ireland or that there was a connection between the Gallgáedil and the Scottish islands in the Irish sources.
 Ketill is described in the sagas as the father-in-law of Olaf the White, a figure some historians believe to be identical with Amlaíb, yet here Caittil is clearly the enemy of Amlaíb.

Jennings and Kruse recognise the deficiencies of the saga materials but suggest that "they should not be summarily written off as void of any historical value". They note that:
 Ari Þorgilsson was drawing on family history that would have "become muddled and mistaken in parts", but that the story is still likely to contain "other parts that can be close to the historical truth".
 In the same way that the historical Caittil can be the same person as the character Keitill, it is widely accepted that Cerball mac Dúnlainge, King of Osraige, is the same person as the saga character Kjarvalr Írakonungr even though their names are dissimilar.
 The Norse sources have Ketill's daughters Thorunn marrying Helgi inn magri, a grandson of Cerball mac Dúnlainge, and Auðr  marrying Olaf the White, both of whom were prominent figures in Ireland, suggesting significant connections between Ketill and the mid-9th century political landscape of that region.
 The Norse traditions provide some members of Kettil's family such as his son Helgi and his great grandson Áleif with Gaelic nicknames, suggesting a link with Gallgáedil traditions. (Helgi Bjólan and Áleif Feilan, which mean Helgi "little mouth" and  Áleif "little wolf".) His daughter Auðr is recorded as a devout Christian, and one of her freedmen, Erpr, has a Pictish name. Ketill's nephew Orlyg Hrappsson is linked to the Celtic church and was a follower of St Columba.
 An individual can have more than one nickname, and dynastic marriages do not always equate to friendship.

Dál Riata

Dál Riata was a Gaelic kingdom in the Argyll and Bute region of Scotland. Jennings and Kruse argue that Ketill Bjornsson could have taken "control of Dál Riata with its islands". They note the correspondence between the Gaelic name Dál Riata and the fact that when Auðr, settled in the Breiðafjörður region  of western Iceland it was in a region called Dalir or Dalaland (modern Dalasýsla).  Furthermore, "in the Breiðafjörður area there is an indisputably nostalgic Celtic precedent for quite a few names." Examples include  islands called Pjattland (Pictland) and Írland (Ireland) and the nearby  Patreksfjörður and Trostansfjörður named in honour of two Celtic saints.

They also quote the Irish Martyrology of Tallaght, which refers to a "[Feast of] Bláán, bishop of Kingarth in Gall-Ghàidheil". This indicates that St Blane of Kingarth in Bute was closely connected to the Gallgáedil. The text is dated not later than the early tenth century and it seems that this part of Dál Riata was by then part of  Gallgáedil-held territory. Fraser (2009) has suggested that Little Dunagoil near Kingarth could have been the Dalriadan Cenél Comgaill capital prior to the Norse incursions.

Catol
The Chronicum Scotorum refers to a battle that took place in 904 in which two grandsons of Ímar and their ally "Catol" were victorious against "Aed" who was evidently a leader in either Ireland or Pictland. It has been suggested that Catol was Ketill Flatnose (although once again the chronology is problematic), or alternatively that he was Cadell ap Rhodri, a King of Gwynedd.

Portrayal
Ketill Flatnose is portrayed by Adam Copeland (better known in WWE by the ring name Edge) in the 5th and 6th season of the historical drama television series Vikings.

Notes

References
 Anderson, Alan Orr, Early Sources of Scottish History: AD 500–1286, 2 vols, Edinburgh: Oliver & Boyd, 1922
 Ballin Smith, Beverley  "Norwick: Shetland's First Viking Settlement?" in Ballin Smith, Beverley, Taylor, Simon and Williams, Gareth (eds) (2007) West Over Sea: Studies in Scandinavian Sea-borne Expansion and Settlement Before 1300. Brill. 
 Crawford, Barbara E. (1987) Scandinavian Scotland. Leicester University Press. 
 
 Fraser, James E. (2009) From Caledonia to Pictland: Scotland to 795. Edinburgh: Edinburgh University Press. 
 Gregory, Donald (1881) The History of the Western Highlands and Isles of Scotland 1493–1625. Edinburgh. Birlinn. 2008 reprint – originally published by Thomas D. Morrison. 
 Hunter, James (2000) Last of the Free: A History of the Highlands and Islands of Scotland. Edinburgh. Mainstream. 
 Jennings, Andrew and Kruse, Arne (2009) "From Dál Riata to the Gall-Ghàidheil". Viking and Medieval Scandinavia. 5. Brepols.
 Ó Corráin, Donnchadh (1979) High-Kings, Vikings and Other Kings Irish Historical Studies Vol. 22, No. 83 (Mar., 1979), pp. 283–323 
 Ó Corráin, Donnchadh (1998) Vikings in Ireland and Scotland in the Ninth Century. CELT.
 Pálsson, Hermann and Edwards, Paul Geoffrey (1981). Orkneyinga Saga: The History of the Earls of Orkney. Penguin Classics. 
 Thomson, William P. L. (2008) The New History of Orkney. Edinburgh. Birlinn. 
 Woolf, Alex (2007) From Pictland to Alba, 789–1070. Edinburgh. Edinburgh University Press. 

9th-century rulers of the Kingdom of the Isles
Monarchs of the Isle of Man
9th-century Norwegian nobility